In the 1998–99 season, MC Alger is competing in the Super Division for the 31st season, as well as the Algerian Cup. It is their 13th consecutive season in the top flight of Algerian football. They will be competing in Super Division, and the Algerian Cup.

Squad list
Players and squad numbers last updated on 18 November 1998.Note: Flags indicate national team as has been defined under FIFA eligibility rules. Players may hold more than one non-FIFA nationality.

Pre-season and friendlies

Competitions

Overview

Championnat National

League table

Results by round

Matches

Championship final

Algerian Cup

Squad information

Appearances and goals

|-

|-
! colspan=10 style=background:#dcdcdc; text-align:center| Players transferred out during the season

Goalscorers
Includes all competitive matches. The list is sorted alphabetically by surname when total goals are equal.

Transfers

In

Out

Notes

References

External links
 1998–99 MC Alger season at sebbar.kazeo.com 

MC Alger seasons
Algerian football clubs 1998–99 season